Clover Stadium is a baseball park in Pomona, New York. It is the home field of the New York Boulders of the independent Frontier League. It has a seating capacity of 6,362 and it opened on June 16, 2011. The stadium is also home to the St. Thomas Aquinas College baseball team (NCAA Division II), who began playing all their home games at the venue in the spring of 2012. The Spartans are the 2014 and 2017 NCAA East Region Champions.

In 2012, the project to design and build the stadium received the Ward House Award from the Lower Hudson Valley Branch of the American Society of Civil Engineers. Originally named Provident Bank Park, naming rights were sold to Palisades Federal Credit Union in April 2016 and to Fiserv in January 2022 who renamed it Clover Stadium for the company's Clover point-of-sale-platform.

Notable events

 The park hosted games 3, 4, and 5 of the 2014 Can-Am League Championship Round, featuring the Rockland Boulders and the New Jersey Jackals. It was the first time in the stadium's history that championship games were played. It did such again in 2016, this time with the Boulders hosting the Ottawa Champions. It hosted again in 2017, with the Boulders hosting the Quebec Capitales.
 Field of Screams, a Halloween themed event for children that is held every October since 2015.
 IceFest 2016 was hosted by the stadium on February 28, 2016. There was an ice rink installed inside the stadium, and the St. Thomas Aquinas College men's ice hockey team played against Columbia University that day. This event marked the first time that another sport other than baseball was played in the stadium.
 Other ice hockey teams that took the ice at the outdoor rink also included Nyack/Tappan Zee High School and Clarkstown North High School.
 The park hosted the 2019 Can-Am League/Frontier League Home Run Derby on July 9, 2019, and the Can-Am League/Frontier League All-Star Game on July 10, 2019.

References

Minor league baseball venues
Sports venues in the New York metropolitan area
Baseball venues in New York (state)
Tourist attractions in Rockland County, New York
Buildings and structures in Rockland County, New York
2011 establishments in New York (state)
Sports venues completed in 2011
College baseball venues in the United States
Ice hockey venues in New York (state)
College ice hockey venues in the United States
Frontier League ballparks